Yannick is a first name that originated in Brittany, France, where the combination of its two Breton language parts, Yann and -ick, results in the meaning of Little John or Petit Jean in French. It is used as a first name mostly for men and is in use, notably, in French-speaking countries like France, (a part of) Belgium, Switzerland (Romandy), Canada  (Quebec),  and former French African colonies.

Notable people with the name 'Yannick' 
Yannick (rapper) (born 1978), French rapper
Yannick Agnel (born 1992), French swimmer and Olympic champion 
Yannick Anzuluni (born 1988), Congolese basketball player
Yannick Bellon (born 1924), French film director, editor and screenwriter 
Yannick Bisson (born 1969), French-Canadian actor
Yannick Bolasie (born 1989), French-Congolese football (soccer) player
Yannick Dalmas (born 1961), French racing driver
Yannick Dias Pupo (born 1988), Brazilian football (soccer) player 
Yannick Djaló (born 1986), Portuguese football (soccer) player
Yannick Carrasco (born 1993), Belgian football (soccer) player who plays for Atletico Madrid
Yannick Franke (born 1996), Dutch basketball player
Yannick Gerhardt (born 1994), German football (soccer) player
Yannick Grannec, 21st century French writer
Yannick Jadot (born 1967), French politician
Yannick Jauzion (born 1978), French rugby player
Yannick Nézet-Séguin (born 1975), French-Canadian conductor
Yannick Ngakoue (born 1995), American football player
Yannick Noah (born 1960), French tennis player, singer
Yannick Ottley (born 1991), Trinidadian cricketer
Yannick Pelletier (born 1976), Swiss chess player
Yannick Peeters (born 1996), Belgian cyclist
Yannick Sagbo (born 1988), French-Ivorian football (soccer) player
Yannick Stopyra (born 1961), French football (soccer) player
Yannick Tremblay (born 1975), French-Canadian ice hockey player who has played in the NHL
Yannick Tremblay (born 1977), French-Canadian ice hockey player who has not played in the NHL
Yannick Weber (born 1988), Swiss ice hockey player

Notable people with the name 'Yanic' 
Yanic Bercier, Canadian musician
Yanic Gentry (born 1991), Mexican sailor
Yanic Perreault (born 1971), French-Canadian ice hockey player
Yanic Truesdale (born 1970), Canadian actor
Yanic Wildschut (born 1991), Dutch professional footballer

Breton masculine given names
French masculine given names
French unisex given names